Tomáš Bernady (born 24 October 1969) is a Czech former football goalkeeper who currently works as a football manager. He took over as manager of Banik Ostrava in October 2013.

He represented Czechoslovakia in the 1989 FIFA World Youth Championship. He won 
Slovak league title in 1999 with Slovan Bratislava, Czechoslovak Cup in 1991 with Baník Ostrava and Slovak Cup in 2003 with Matador Púchov.

Honours
Individual
Toulon Tournament Best Goalkeeper: 1990

References

External links
 
 Profile at footballdatabase.eu
 Profile at FC Baník Ostrava web

1969 births
Living people
Czech footballers
Czechoslovak footballers
FC Baník Ostrava players
FK Drnovice players
FK Inter Bratislava players
ŠK Slovan Bratislava players
Sportspeople from Ostrava
Czech football managers
Czech First League managers
FC Baník Ostrava managers
Association football goalkeepers
1. FC Tatran Prešov players
MŠK Púchov players